It's Just My Funny Way of Laughin' is a 1962 album by Burl Ives, recorded in Nashville, Tennessee. It rose to No. 24 on Billboard (magazine)'''s 1962 Pop Albums Chart. During the same year, the title song, composed by Hank Cochran, reached No. 3 on Billboard's Contemporary Adult Singles Chart, No. 9 on the Country Singles Chart, and No. 10 on the Pop Singles Chart. The title song earned Ives a Grammy Award for Best Country and Western Recording. Another song, "Call Me Mr. In-Between," composed by Harlan Howard, peaked at No. 3 on the Country Singles Chart, No. 6 on the Adult Contemporary Singles Chart, and No. 19 on the Pop Singles Chart.

"What You Gonna Do, Leroy" was covered by Buddy Miller and Julie Miller for their 2009 album Written in Chalk Track listing 

References

 Back of album cover, It's Just My Funny Way of Laughin''', Decca DL74279, 1962
 Allmusic: Burl Ives: Charts and Awards: [ Billboard Albums],  [ Billboard Singles], and [ Grammy Awards]
 Allmusic: Burl Ives: Songs: [ All Songs]

1962 albums
Burl Ives albums
Decca Records albums